Chrisley is a surname. Notable people with the surname include:

Neil Chrisley (1931–2013), American baseball player
Todd Chrisley, American millionaire and star of reality television series Chrisley Knows Best